Mount Zion Baptist Church is a historic church at 212 Second Street in Anniston, Alabama. It was built in 1890 and added to the National Register of Historic Places in 1985.

References

Baptist churches in Alabama
Churches on the National Register of Historic Places in Alabama
National Register of Historic Places in Calhoun County, Alabama
Romanesque Revival church buildings in Alabama
Churches completed in 1890
Churches in Calhoun County, Alabama